Salebius is a genus of silken fungus beetles in the family Cryptophagidae. There are at least four described species in Salebius.

Species
These four species belong to the genus Salebius:
 Salebius hirsutus Dajoz, 1988
 Salebius lictor Casey, 1900
 Salebius minax Casey, 1900
 Salebius octodentatus (Mäklin, 1852)

References

Further reading

 
 
 
 

Cryptophagidae
Articles created by Qbugbot